HMS Ontario can refer to several ships:

 , a Royal Navy schooner captured in 1756
 , a Royal Navy brig-sloop that sank in a storm in Lake Ontario during the American Revolutionary War and whose wreck was discovered in June 2008 between Niagara and Rochester.
 , a Royal Navy  ordered as HMS Mohawk and sold off in 1832.

See also
 Ontario (disambiguation)
 
 

Royal Navy ship names